The 1916 All-Western Conference football team consists of American football players selected to the all-conference team for the Western Conference, later known as the Big Ten Conference, as chosen by various selectors for the 1916 college football season.

All-Western Conference selections

Ends
 Bert Baston, Minnesota (WE-1; AX-1; IV-1)
 Paul Meyers, Wisconsin (WE-1)
 Charles Bolen, Ohio (AX-1)
 Reynold Kraft, Illinois (WE-2; IV-1)
 Frederick I. Norman, Northwestern (WE-2)

Tackles
 Jackson, Chicago (WE-1)
 Frank A. R. Mayer, Minnesota (WE-1)
 George Hauser, Minnesota (AX-1)
 Elmer T. Rundquist, Illinois (WE-2)
 Reding Putnam, Northwestern (WE-2)

Guards
 Ray Eklund, Minnesota (WE-1; IV-1)
 Leonard L. Charpier, Illinois (WE-1)
 M. J. Proud, Purdue (AX-1)
 Gilbert S. Sinclair, Minnesota (AX-1)
 Eldon J. Smith, Northwestern (IV-1)
 Higgins, Chicago (WE-2)

Centers
 Fred Becker, Iowa (WE-1; AX-1 [tackle])
 John L. Townley, Jr., Minnesota (AX-1; IV-1; WE-2 [guard])
 Charles Carpenter, Wisconsin (WE-2)
 Fisher, Chicago (IV-2)
 Ferdinand Holtkamp, Ohio State (AX-2; IV-2 [guard])

Quarterbacks
 Bart Macomber, Illinois (WE-1; AX-1; IV-1)
 Claire Long, Minnesota (WE-2; AX-2; IV-2)

Halfbacks
 Chic Harley, Ohio State (WE-1; AX-1; IV-1)
 Paddy Driscoll, Northwestern (WE-1; AX-1; IV-1)
 Eber Simpson, Wisconsin (AX-2; IV-2)
 Archie Erehart, Indiana (WE-2; AX-2)
 J. Elwood Davis, Iowa (WE-2)
 Joseph M. Sprafka, Minnesota (IV-2)

Fullbacks
 Pudge Wyman, Minnesota (WE-1; AX-1; IV-1)
 Bob Koehler, Northwestern (WE-2; AX-2; IV-2)

Key

WE = Walter Eckersall in the Chicago Tribune

AX = G. W. Axelson in the Chicago Herald

IV = Irving Vaughn in the Chicago Examiner

Bold = consensus choice by a majority of the selectors

See also
1916 College Football All-America Team
1916 All-Western college football team

References

1916 Western Conference football season
All-Big Ten Conference football teams